Pembina Band of Chippewa Indians (Ojibwe: Aniibiminani-ziibiwininiwag)
are a historical band of Chippewa (Ojibwe), originally living along the Red River of the North and its tributaries.
Through the treaty process with the United States, the Pembina Band were settled on reservations in Minnesota and North Dakota.  Some tribal members refusing settlement in North Dakota relocated northward and westward, some eventually settling in Montana.

The successors apparent of the Pembina Band are:
 Chippewa Cree Tribe of the Rocky Boys Indian Reservation (Montana) (in part);
 Little Shell Tribe of Chippewa Indians of Montana (in full);
 Red Lake Band of Chippewa (Minnesota) (in part);
 Roseau River Anishinabe First Nation (Manitoba) (in full);
 Turtle Mountain Band of Chippewa Indians (North Dakota) (in full); and
 White Earth Band of Ojibwe (Minnesota) (in part).

Other uses 

The so-called Little Shell Pembina Band of North America, based in North Dakota, is a militia-type group made up of one family descended from the historical Little Shell Chippewa Band, mostly white militia members, and one Indonesian, who attempted a coup against the government of Fiji.  It claims to be a successor apparent of the Pembina Band, but it is not recognized as a Native American tribe by the US federal government nor by North Dakota.

References

External links
Anti-Defamation League's article on the Little Shell Pembina Band of North America

Ojibwe governments
First Nations governments in Manitoba
Native American tribes in Minnesota
Native American tribes in North Dakota
Native American tribes in Montana